Mayhew Creek is a stream in Benton County, Minnesota, in the United States.

Mayhew Creek was named for George V. Mayhew, a pioneer who settled near the creek.

See also
List of rivers of Minnesota

References

Rivers of Minnesota
Rivers of Benton County, Minnesota